"Have You Ever Needed Someone So Bad" is a song by English hard rock band Def Leppard from their fifth studio album, Adrenalize (1992). In the United States, the song reached number seven on the Album Rock Tracks charts and number 12 on the Billboard Hot 100, making the song the most successful single from the album in the US. The Acoustic Hippies from Hell, credited on the B-side tracks, was the name used by Def Leppard and the Hothouse Flowers performing together. The song was performed extensively during the Adrenalize and Slang tours but rarely after, most recently being done acoustically during the band's 2019 Vegas residency, and the 2022 Stadium Tour.

Track listings
CD: Bludgeon Riffola / LEPCD 8 (UK) / 864 151-2 (INT)
 "Have You Ever Needed Someone So Bad"
 "From the Inside" (The Acoustic Hippies from Hell)
 "You Can't Always Get What You Want" (Rolling Stones cover) (The Acoustic Hippies from Hell)
 "Little Wing" (Jimi Hendrix cover) (The Acoustic Hippies from Hell)

12-inch: Bludgeon Riffola / LEPXP 8 (UK) / INT 864 149-1 / picture disc

This 12-inch single picture disc has a stretched Adrenalize graphic in the cover. On the back side of the picture disc has the picture of Vivian Campbell. The back cardboard has the 12-inch single information and a band picture. Pictures by Ross Halfin. Artwork and Design by Andie Airfix at Satori.
 "Have You Ever Needed Someone So Bad"
 "From the Inside" (The Acoustic Hippies from Hell)
 "You Can't Always Get What You Want" (The Acoustic Hippies from Hell)

Charts

Weekly charts

Year-end charts

References

Def Leppard songs
1990s ballads
1992 songs
1992 singles
Mercury Records singles
Music videos directed by Wayne Isham
Songs written by Joe Elliott
Songs written by Phil Collen
Songs written by Robert John "Mutt" Lange